The 12th Flying Training Wing is a wing of the Japan Air Self-Defense Force. It is also sometimes known as the 12th Flight Training Wing. It comes under the authority of Air Training Command. It is based at Hōfu-kita Air Base in Yamaguchi Prefecture.

It has two squadrons, both equipped with Fuji T-7 aircraft:
 1st Flight Training Squadron
 2nd Flight Training Squadron

References

Units of the Japan Air Self-Defense Force